The 1933 Tulane Green Wave football team represented Tulane University as a member of the Southeastern Conference (SEC) during the 1933 college football season. Led by second-year head coach  Ted Cox, the Green Wave played their home games at Tulane Stadium in New Orleans. Tulane finished the season with an overall record of 6–3–1 and a mark of 4–2–1 in conference play, placing fifth in the SEC.

Schedule

References

Tulane
Tulane Green Wave football seasons
Tulane Green Wave football